This is a list of amphibious warfare ships of the Royal Navy of the United Kingdom.

Active ships
  Landing platform dock (LPD)
Albion 
Bulwark - extended readiness

Decommissioned

Ocean class
Landing platform helicopter ship	
Ocean

Fearless class
Landing platform dock ships
Fearless
Intrepid

Centaur class
Commando carrier ships
Albion
Bulwark
Hermes

Colossus class
Commando carrier ships
Ocean
Theseus

Landing Ships, Tank (LST)
 
 
 
 
 
 
LST 3001
LST 3002
LST 3003 Anzio
LST 3004
LST 3005
LST 3006 Tromsø
LST 3007
LST 3008
LST 3009
LST 3010 Attacker
LST 3011 Avenger
LST 3012 Ben Nevis
LST 3013 Ben Lomond
LST 3014
LST 3015 Battler
LST 3016 Dieppe
LST 3017
LST 3018
LST 3019 Vaagso
LST 3020
LST 3021
LST 3022
LST 3023
LST 3024
LST 3025 Bruiser
LST 3026 Charger
LST 3027 Lofoten
LST 3028
LST 3029 Chaser
LST 3031
LST 3033
LST 3035
LST 3036 Puncher
LST 3037
LST 3038 Fighter
LST 3042 Hunter
LST 3041
LST 3043 Messina
LST 3044 Narvik
LST 3501
LST 3502
LST 3503
LST 3504 Pursuer
LST 3505 Ravager
LST 3506
LST 3507
LST 3508 Searcher
LST 3509
LST 3510 Slinger
LST 3511 Reggio
LST 3512
LST 3513 Salerno
LST 3514 Smiter
LST 3515 Stalker
LST 3516 Striker
LST 3517 St Nazaire
LST 3518 Sulva
LST 3519
LST 3520 Thruster
LST 3522 Tracker
LST 3523 Trouncer
LST 3524 Trumpeter
LST 3525 Walcheren
LST 3532 Zeebrugge
LST 3534

Casa Grande class
Landing platform  dock ships

References

Amphibious assault ships
Royal Navy
Royal Navy